Bestyakhsky Rural Okrug may refer to:
 Bestyakhsky Rural Okrug in Bestyakhsky District
 Bestyakhsky Rural Okrug in Isitsky District
 Bestyakhsky Rural Okrug in Zhigansky District
 (possibly) Bestyakhsky National Rural Okrug